Alexandra Park is a public park in Oldham, Greater Manchester, England. It was created in response to the Lancashire Cotton Famine of 1861–1865 as an attempt to keep local textile workers employed. The park is located in the Glodwick area of Oldham.

Oldham was hit hard by the Lancashire Cotton Famine of 1861–1865 when supplies of raw cotton from the United States were cut off. Wholly reliant upon the textile processing industry, the economy of Oldham strained as the cotton famine created chronic unemployment in the town. By 1863 a committee had been formed and with a loan from central government, land at Swine Clough was purchased from Reverend John Cocker of Shaw and Crompton whom made it a condition that local unemployed cotton workers were employed to construct the park which opened on 28 August 1865.
John Thomas Cocker, Esq., of New-bank Heyside purchased the estate of Swine Clough in 1850 from the Ogden Family. This family enjoyed this estate for several generations. It was sold to Adam Ogden the elder in 1670 by Edmund Assheton, Esq., of Chadderton, Swine Clough was an ancient farm a short distance to the west of Glodwick.

Opened by Josiah M Radcliffe, the then Mayor of Oldham, the park was named to commemorate the marriage of Albert, Prince of Wales to Alexandra of Denmark. During its history it has had a "refreshment room", a boating lake (constructed in 1903) and been the site of statues honouring local Oldhamers of eminence.

A number of structures in the park are grade II listed, including ornamental features, buildings and statues of John Platt and Robert Ascroft.

Oldham council plans to open a state of the art eco-centre at the park sometime in Spring 2022.

References

External links
Alexandra Park - History in Postcards & Photographs
Parks and commons in the Metropolitan Borough of Oldham
History of the Metropolitan Borough of Oldham
1865 establishments in England